Philip E. Satterthwaite is a British Old Testament scholar. He has been principal of Biblical Graduate School of Theology since 2011, succeeding Quek Swee Hwa to that position.

Education 
Satterthwaite obtained degrees from the University of Oxford and the University of Cambridge before obtaining a PhD from the University of Manchester. Working under the supervision of Barnabas Lindars, his thesis was Narrative Artistry and the Composition of Judges 17-21 (1989).

Ministry 
Satterthwaite was Assistant Editor of Tyndale Bulletin between 1993 and 1998.

References

Living people
British biblical scholars
Old Testament scholars
Alumni of the University of Oxford
Alumni of the University of Cambridge
Alumni of the University of Manchester
Seminary presidents
Year of birth missing (living people)